{{DISPLAYTITLE:Coenzyme F420}}

Coenzyme F420 or 8-hydroxy-5-deazaflavin is a coenzyme (sometimes called a cofactor) involved in redox reactions in methanogens, in many Actinomycetota, and sporadically in other bacterial lineages. It is a flavin derivative. The coenzyme is a substrate for coenzyme F420 hydrogenase, 5,10-methylenetetrahydromethanopterin reductase and methylenetetrahydromethanopterin dehydrogenase.

A particularly rich natural source of F420 is Mycobacterium smegmatis, in which several dozen enzymes use F420 instead of the related cofactor FMN used by homologous enzymes in most other species. Eukaryotes including the fruit fly Drosophila melanogaster and the algae Ostreococcus tauri  also use a precursor to this cofactor.

Biosynthesis 
Coenzyme F420 is synthesized via a multi-step pathway:
 7,8-didemethyl-8-hydroxy-5-deazariboflavin synthase produces Coenzyme FO (also written F0), itself a cofactor of DNA photolyase (antenna). This is the head portion of the molecule.
 2-phospho-L-lactate transferase produces Coenzyme F420-0, the portion containing the head, the diphosphate bridge, and ending with a carboxylic acid group.
 Coenzyme F420-0:L-glutamate ligase puts a glutamate residue at the -COOH end, producing Coenzyme F420-1.
 Coenzyme F420-1:gamma-L-glutamate ligase puts a gamma-glutamate residue at the -COOH end, producing Coenzyme F420-2, the final compound (in its oxidized form).

See also 
 Coenzyme M
 Coenzyme B
 Methanofuran
 Tetrahydromethanopterin

References

External links 
 KEGG:
 FO
 F420-0
 F420-1
 Reduced F420
 Oxidised F420

Coenzymes
Flavins